Harry Frank Lewis,  (born 1939) is a Canadian broadcaster and politician who served as the 28th lieutenant governor of Prince Edward Island, as  viceregal representative of Queen Elizabeth II of Canada in the Province of Prince Edward Island. He held the position from August 15, 2011, until October 20, 2017, and was succeeded by Antoinette Perry who was appointed on September 14, 2017.

Born in 1939 in York, Queens County, Prince Edward Island, Lewis started working at CFCY-FM in Charlottetown in 1966 and retired in 2004 when he was a vice president and General Manager. Since his retirement, he worked as a senior advisor for Newcap Radio. He was appointed the 28th Lieutenant Governor of Prince Edward Island on July 28, 2011, by Governor General of Canada David Lloyd Johnston on the Constitutional advice of Prime Minister of Canada Stephen Harper. He was sworn in by David Jenkins, the Chief Justice of the Supreme Court of Prince Edward Island, on August 15, 2011, at Province House. As Lieutenant Governor, Lewis is Chancellor of the Order of Prince Edward Island.

In 2006 he was inducted into the Canadian Association of Broadcasters Hall of Fame.

References

Canadian radio executives
Lieutenant Governors of Prince Edward Island
Members of the Order of Canada
Members of the Order of Prince Edward Island
People from Queens County, Prince Edward Island
1939 births
Living people
21st-century Canadian politicians